The Faculty of Medicine, Chiang Mai University is the third oldest medical school in Thailand located in Mueang Chiang Mai, Chiang Mai and is the first medical school in Thailand to be set up in a regional location outside Bangkok.

History 
The need for increased medical personnel in Thailand rose rapidly and the country only had two medical schools at the time which was the Faculty of Medicine Siriraj Hospital and Faculty of Medicine Chulalongkorn Hospital of the University of Medical Sciences (now Mahidol University). Therefore, the University and the Ministry of Public Health proposed the construction of the Faculty of Medicine Nakorn Chiang Mai Hospital which was to be set up to spread medical education to more regional parts of Thailand. This was done in 1954 and in 1956 involved cooperation with United States Overseas Missions (USOM), providing the funding, equipment and technology for the medical school. The organisation of the faculty was approved by the cabinet on 12 December 1956 and construction was ordered by royal decree of King Bhumibol Adulyadej on 28 October 1959.

Chiang Mai University was then founded in 1964 by royal decree and officially opened on 24 January 1965. On 16 March 1965, the Faculty of Medicine was moved from the University of Medical Sciences to Chiang Mai University and so became the Faculty of Medicine, Chiang Mai University.

As of the 2018 academic year, the Faculty of Medicine Chiang Mai University accepted 258 undergraduate students for the Medicine (MD) course.

Departments 

 Department of Anaethesiology
 Department of Anatomy
 Department of Biomedical Science
 Department of Community Medicine
 Department of Emergency Medicine
 Department of Family Medicine
 Department of Forensic Medicine
 Department of Internal Medicine
 Department of Obstetrics and Gynaecology
 Department of Ophthalmology
 Department of Orthopaedics
 Department of Otolaryngology
 Department of Parasitology
 Department of Pathology
 Department of Paediatrics
 Department of Pharmacology
 Department of Physical Therapy
 Department of Psychology
 Department of Radiology
 Department of Rehabilitation Medicine
 Department of Surgery

Teaching Hospitals 

 Maharaj Nakorn Chiang Mai Hospital
 Chiangrai Prachanukroh Hospital (CPIRD)
 Lampang Hospital (CPIRD)

See also 

 List of medical schools in Thailand

References 

 Article incorporates material from the corresponding article in the Thai Wikipedia

Chiang Mai University
Medical schools in Thailand
University departments in Thailand
1960s in Chiang Mai